Lake Gregory Waterdrome is an open water aerodrome facility used by seaplanes on Lake Gregory, near the town of Nuwara Eliya in Sri Lanka.

Airlines and destinations

References

External links 

Airports in Sri Lanka
Nuwara Eliya